Shizi may refer to:

Shizi (book), a 4th-century BCE Syncretic philosophy text
Shizi, Langxi County (十字镇), town in Langxi County, Anhui
Shizi, Quanjiao County (十字镇), town in Quanjiao County, Anhui
Ou Shizi (1234–1324), Song Dynasty scholar

The Chinese word for lion (獅子)
Chinese guardian lions, a common representation of the lion in imperial China
Shih Tzu, a dog breed named after the Chinese lion guardians
Pekingese, a dog breed called shizi (lion) by the Chinese
Shizi, Qichun County (狮子镇), town in Qichun County, Huanggang, Hubei
Shizi, a village in Xinghua Township, Hong'an County, Huanggang, Hubei
Shizi, Pingtung (獅子鄉), township in Pingtung County, Taiwan

See also
Foo Dog (disambiguation)
Shizi (fruit)